The American Yacht Club in Newburyport, Massachusetts describes itself as "America's oldest continually operating private yacht club" despite many U.S. yacht clubs having been established in the forty years preceding its 1885 establishment and 1890 incorporation.

References

External links

Newburyport, Massachusetts
Sailing in Massachusetts
Sports clubs established in 1885
Yacht clubs in the United States